Charalampos Loizou (born January 3, 1982 in Larnaca) is a Cypriot football midfielder who currently plays for Dumlupınar.

External links
 

Living people
1982 births
Cypriot footballers
Ermis Aradippou FC players
Ethnikos Achna FC players
P.O. Xylotymbou players
Cypriot First Division players
Association football midfielders